The James T. Grady-James H. Stack Award for Interpreting Chemistry for the Public is awarded on a yearly basis by the American Chemical Society. The Award recognizes outstanding reporting on chemistry, chemical engineering, and related chemical fields. Typically the winner must have communicated to the public through "the press, radio, television, films, the lecture platform, books, or pamphlets for the lay public." The award consists of $5,000 and a medallion. The Award was established in 1955 as the James T. Grady Award; in 1984 "James H. Stack" was added to the award name.

Recipients

 1957 David H. Killeffer
 1958 William L. Laurence
 1959 Alton L. Blakeslee
 1960 Watson Davis
 1961 David Dietz
 1962 John F. Baxter
 1963 Lawrence Lessing
 1964 Nate Haseltine
 1965 Isaac Asimov
 1966 Frank E. Carey
 1967 Irving S. Bengelsdorf
 1968 Raymond A. Bruner
 1969 Walter S. Sullivan
 1970 Robert C. Cowen
 1971 Victor Cohn
 1972 Daniel Q. Posin
 1973 O. A. Battista
 1974 Ronald Kotulak
 1975 Jon Franklin
 1976 Gene Bylinsky
 1977 Patrick Young
 1978 Michael Woods
 1979 Peter Gwynne
 1980 Edward Edelson
 1981 Robert W. Cooke
 1982 Albert Rosenfeld
 1983 Matt Clark
 1984 Cristine Russell
 1985 Joe Alper
 1986 Ben Patrusky
 1987 Al Rossiter, Jr.
 1988 Arthur Fisher
 1989 Robert Kanigel
 1990 Jerry E. Bishop
 1991 Betty Debnam
 1992 Malcolm Browne
 1993 Tom Siegfried
 1994 Don Herbert
 1995 Ivan Amato
 1996 Elizabeth Pennisi
 1997 Richard Lipkin
 1998 Joe Palca
 1999 Joseph A. Schwarcz
 2000 Jeff Wheelwright
 2001 David Perlman
 2002 Curt Suplee
 2003 Boyce Rensberger
 2004 William S. Hammack
 2005 Robert L. Wolke
 2006 Philip Ball
 2007 Stuart F. Brown
 2008 Harold McGee
 2009 Roald Hoffmann
 2010 Ron Seely
 2011 Theodore Gray
 2012 Paul Raeburn
 2013 Shirley O. Corriher
 2014 Alan Alda
 2015 Deborah Blum
 2016 Peter Atkins
 2017 Thomas Hager
 2018 Bassam Shakhashiri
 2019 Sir Martyn Poliakoff
 2020 Raychelle Burks
 2021 Sam Kean

See also

 List of chemistry awards

References

1955 establishments in the United States
American journalism awards
Awards established in 1955
Awards of the American Chemical Society
Science communication awards
Science writing awards